Weldon Edwards may refer to:
Weldon Edwards (American football) (1924–1988), American football offensive tackle
Weldon Nathaniel Edwards (1788–1873), American politician from North Carolina
Weldon W. Edwards, American politician from Mississippi